Asperdaphne vestalis is a species of sea snail, a marine gastropod mollusk in the family Raphitomidae.

Description
The length of the shell attains 8 mm, its diameter 3.75 mm.

(Original description) The ovate, rather solid shell is angled at the shoulder, constricted at the base. Its colour is white. It contains  five whorls, plus a two-whorled protoconch. The shell shows rounded spiral cords, the longitudinal series amounting to about twenty on the body whorl and eight on the penultimate. These are  crossing and knotting a spiral series amounting to about thirty-seven on the penultimate. The longitudinals vanish at the base and are effaced behind the aperture. The suture is channelled. The protoconch is smooth. The aperture is wide. The outer lip is simple and without sinus.

Distribution
This marine species is endemic to Australia and occurs off New South Wales, South Australia and Victoria.

References

 Laseron, C. 1954. Revision of the New South Wales Turridae (Mollusca). Australian Zoological Handbook. Sydney : Royal Zoological Society of New South Wales pp. 56, pls 1–12. 
 Cotton, B.C. 1959. South Australian Mollusca. Archaeogastropoda. Handbook of the Flora and Fauna of South Australia. Adelaide : South Australian Government Printer 449 pp.
 Powell, A.W.B. 1966. The molluscan families Speightiidae and Turridae, an evaluation of the valid taxa, both Recent and fossil, with list of characteristic species. Bulletin of the Auckland Institute and Museum. Auckland, New Zealand 5: 1–184, pls 1–23

External links
 Verco, J.C. 1909. Notes on South Australian marine Mollusca with descriptions of new species. Part XII. Transactions of the Royal Society of South Australia 33: 293-342
 
  Hedley, C. 1922. A revision of the Australian Turridae. Records of the Australian Museum 13(6): 213-359, pls 42-56 

vestalis
Gastropods described in 1903
Gastropods of Australia